The precise dates of the lives of hermit Saint Mark of the Caves, (also known as St. Mark the Grave-digger) and the two sainted brothers Theophil and John are not recorded, however, their story is preserved in the Kiev Caves Paterikon.

Saint Mark is noted for his service to Theophil and John in the paterikon because of his gift of discernment and powerful vocation of intercession with the Lord.

Saints Mark, Theophil and John are commemorated 29 December in the Eastern Orthodox Church and Byzantine Catholic Churches.

See also

Russian Orthodox Church
Poustinia
John the Hairy
Theoctiste of Lesbos

References

Holy Trinity Orthodox Church
OCA Lives of the Saints - 29 December

Year of birth unknown
Year of death unknown
Russian saints of the Eastern Orthodox Church
Russian hermits